Gianpiero Moretti (20 March 1940 – 14 January 2012) was an Italian racing driver and the founder of the MOMO in the 1960s. He was born in Milan.

Moretti won the 24 Hours of Daytona, in 1998, driving a Ferrari 333SP with co-drivers Mauro Baldi, Arie Luyendyk and Didier Theys. Moretti died on 14 January 2012 in Milan of cancer.  He was 71.

References

1940 births
2012 deaths
24 Hours of Daytona drivers
24 Hours of Le Mans drivers
World Sportscar Championship drivers
Racing drivers from Milan
Deaths from cancer in Lombardy
12 Hours of Sebring drivers

Team Joest drivers